Steelheart or Steel Heart may refer to:
 Steelheart, an American glam metal band
 Steelheart (album), their 1990 debut album
 Steelheart (film), a 1912 American silent film
 Steelheart (novel), 2013, by Brandon Sanderson
 Steel Heart (horse), a racehorse
 Steelheart, a character in the American animated television series SilverHawks